Statistics of Belgian First Division in the 1938–39 season.

Overview

It was contested by 14 teams, and Beerschot won the championship.

Owing to the outbreak of World War II, the 1939-40 Belgian League season was suspended after 9 matches, and was not restarted until 1941-42 (although an unofficial 1940-41 Championship took place).

League standings

Results

References

Belgian Pro League seasons
Belgian First Division, 1938-39
1938–39 in Belgian football